Youssef Mohamed (5 January 1927 – 23 November 2001) was an Egyptian basketball player. He competed in the men's tournament at the 1948 Summer Olympics and the 1952 Summer Olympics. He later became the President of the Egyptian Basketball Federation.

References

External links
 

1927 births
2001 deaths
Egyptian men's basketball players
Olympic basketball players of Egypt
Basketball players at the 1948 Summer Olympics
Basketball players at the 1952 Summer Olympics
Place of birth missing
1950 FIBA World Championship players